Abdulaziz Al-Mohammed (born 22 December 1987) is a Saudi Arabian footballer who plays as a midfielder for Al-Jeel.

References

External links
 

1987 births
Living people
Saudi Arabian footballers
Association football midfielders
Ittihad FC players
Al-Taawoun FC players
Al-Watani Club players
Al-Tai FC players
Jeddah Club players
Abha Club players
Ohod Club players
Al-Bukayriyah FC players
Al-Jabalain FC players
Al-Diriyah Club players
Al-Hejaz Club players
Al-Okhdood Club players
Al-Rayyan Club (Saudi Arabia) players
Wej SC players
Al Jeel Club players
Saudi Professional League players
Saudi First Division League players
Saudi Second Division players
Saudi Fourth Division players